Tocolytics (also called anti-contraction medications or labor suppressants) are medications used to suppress premature labor (from Greek τόκος tókos, "childbirth", and λύσις lúsis, "loosening"). Preterm birth accounts for 70% of neonatal deaths. Therefore, tocolytic therapy is provided when delivery would result in premature birth, postponing delivery long enough for the administration of glucocorticoids, which accelerate fetal lung maturity but may require one to two days to take effect.

Commonly used tocolytic medications include β2 agonists, calcium channel blockers, NSAIDs, and magnesium sulfate. These can assist in delaying preterm delivery by suppressing uterine muscle contractions and their use is intended to reduce fetal morbidity and mortality associated with preterm birth. The suppression of contractions is often only partial and tocolytics can only be relied on to delay birth for a matter of days. Depending on the tocolytic used, the pregnant woman or fetus may require monitoring (e.g., blood pressure monitoring when nifedipine is used as it reduces blood pressure; cardiotocography to assess fetal well-being). In any case, the risk of preterm labor alone justifies hospitalization.

Indications 
Tocolytics are used in preterm labor, which refers to when a baby is born too early before 37 weeks of pregnancy. As preterm birth represents one of the leading causes of neonatal morbidity and mortality, the goal is to prevent neonatal morbidity and mortality through delaying delivery and increasing gestational age by gaining more time for other management strategies like corticosteroids therapy that may help with fetus lung maturity. Tocolytics are considered for women with confirmed preterm labor between 24 and 34 weeks of gestation age and used in conjunction with other therapies that may include corticosteroids administration, fetus neuroprotection, and safe transfer to facilities.

Types of agents
There is no clear first-line tocolytic agent. Current evidence suggests that first line treatment with β2 agonists, calcium channel blockers, or NSAIDs to prolong pregnancy for up to 48 hours is the best course of action to allow time for glucocorticoid administration.

Various types of agents are used, with varying success rates and side effects. Some medications are not specifically approved by the U.S. Food and Drug Administration (FDA) for use in stopping uterine contractions in preterm labor, instead being used off-label.

According to a 2022 Cochrane review, the most effective tocolytics for delaying preterm birth by 48 hours, and 7 days were the nitric oxide donors, calcium channel blockers, oxytocin receptor antagonists and combinations of tocolytics.

Calcium-channel blockers (such as nifedipine) and oxytocin antagonists (such as atosiban) may delay delivery by 2 to 7 days, depending on how quickly the medication is administered. NSAIDs (such as indomethacin) and calcium channel blockers (such as nifedipine) are the most likely to delay delivery for 48 hours, with the least amount of maternal and neonatal side effects. Otherwise, tocolysis is rarely successful beyond 24 to 48 hours because current medications do not alter the fundamentals of labor activation. However, postponing premature delivery by 48 hours appears sufficient to allow pregnant women to be transferred to a center specialized for management of preterm deliveries, and thus administer corticosteroids for the possibility to reduce neonatal organ immaturity.

The efficacy of β-adrenergic agonists, atosiban, and indomethacin is a decreased odds ratio (OR) of delivery within 24 hours of 0.54 (95% confidence interval (CI): 0.32-0.91) and 0.47 within 48 hours (OR 0.47, 95% CI: 0.30-0.75).

Antibiotics were thought to delay delivery, but no studies have shown any evidence that using antibiotics during preterm labor effectively delays delivery or reduces neonatal morbidity. Antibiotics are used in people with premature rupture of membranes, but this is not characterized as tocolysis.

Contraindications to tocolytics
In addition to drug-specific contraindications, several general factors may contraindicate delaying childbirth with the use of tocolytic medications.
 Fetus is older than 34 weeks gestation
 Fetus weighs less than 2.5 kg, or has intrauterine growth restriction (IUGR) or placental insufficiency
 Lethal congenital or chromosomal abnormalities
 Cervical dilation is greater than 4 centimeters
 Chorioamnionitis or intrauterine infection is present
 Pregnant woman has severe pregnancy-induced hypertension, severe eclampsia/preeclampsia, active vaginal bleeding, placental abruption, a cardiac disease, or another condition which indicates that the pregnancy should not continue.
 Maternal hemodynamic instability with bleeding
 Intrauterine fetal demise, lethal fetal anomaly, or non-reassuring fetal status

Future direction of tocolytics
Most tocolytics are currently being used off-label. The future direction of the development of tocolytics agents should be directed toward better efficacy in intentionally prolonging pregnancy. This will potentially result in less maternal, fetal, and neonatal adverse effects when delaying preterm childbirth. A few tocolytic alternatives worth pursuing include Barusiban, a last generation of oxytocin receptor antagonists, as well as COX-2 inhibitors. More studies on the use of multiple tocolytics must be directed to research overall health outcomes rather than solely pregnancy prolongation.

See also
 Labor induction

References

Chemical substances for emergency medicine
 
Obstetric drugs
Obstetrics
Obstetrical procedures
Childbirth